

The MDG Midgy-Club was a post-war cabin biplane designed and built by Instruments de Precision M.D.G at Garches, France. The company designed and built precision instruments and due to the close relationship with the aviation industry, the company designed and built two aircraft. The first, MDG LD.45, was a single-seat biplane. The MDG LD-261 Midgy-Club was a follow-on design with an enclosed cabin with two seats arranged in tandem layout. It was built in small numbers.

Specifications

References

 

1940s French civil utility aircraft
Single-engined tractor aircraft
Aircraft first flown in 1946